The Employers and Workmen Act 1875 (38 & 39 Vict c 90) was an Act of the Parliament of the United Kingdom, enacted during Benjamin Disraeli's second administration. The Act extended to Ireland, which at that time was part of the United Kingdom. This Act was repealed for Great Britain by the Statute Law (Repeals) Act 1973.

Background
The Act purported to place both sides of industry in equal footing allowing all breaches of contract to be covered by civil law. Prior to the Act, employers were subjected to civil law which could result in a fine while employees could be subjected to criminal law which may have led to a fine and imprisonment. Disraeli proudly commented, "We have settled the long and vexatious contest between capital and labour" and hoped this would "gain and retain for the Conservatives the lasting affection of the working classes".

Content
Section 3(3) was interpreted by the Courts to allow an award of specific performance for completion of work.

Section 4 was interpreted to mean that a worker who was absent from work could be prosecuted and pay damages to his employer (even if the employer could not show a monetary loss on ordinary principles).

Section 15 noted that in Ireland, the senior judicial officer was the Lord Chancellor of Ireland and the county courts in Ireland were known as the Civil Bill Courts.

See also
UK labour law
Conspiracy, and Protection of Property Act 1875
Nokes v Doncaster Amalgamated Collieries Ltd [1940] AC 1014

References
Thomas James Arnold. The Conspiracy and Protection of Property Act, 1875 (38 & 39 Vict. c. 86), and the Employers and Workmen Act, 1875 (38 & 39 Vict. c. 90). Shaw & Sons. Fetter Lane and Crane Court, London. 1876. Google Books.
George Howell. A Handy-Book of the Labour Laws. Third Edition, Revised. Macmillan & Co. London (and New York). 1895. Chapters 1 to 3. Pages 1 to 36.

External links
Hansard, Second Reading

United Kingdom Acts of Parliament 1875
United Kingdom labour law
1875 in labor relations
Employers